Michael John Lesser (28 September 1943 – 1 July 2015) was a mathematical philosopher and political activist. He was born in London.

Early life
The youngest member of the Committee of 100, he was sent, aged 16, to Wormwood Scrubs Prison along with most of the Committee. He served two spells as contributor to London's underground journal International Times.

He was active in May 1968 in France.

Career
In 1992 he was the co-author, with Prof A. Wuensche, of the book The Global Dynamics Of Cellular Automata, published in the "Santa Fe Institute's Reference Volumes". The book is an atlas of emergent forms evolving from the apparently chaotic product of a set of iterated logical operations.

He was assistant to the Directing Professor, P. Allen, at the Institute for Ecotechnological Research at Cranfield University. He is the co-author of several scientific papers on dynamical systems theory with Prof Allen.

He worked on super computers at NASA's Goddard Jet Propulsion Lab, Washington, D.C., United States, and at the Rutherford Appleton Laboratories, Oxon, UK.

He published papers on Autism with Dr. Dinah Murray with whom he co-founded Autism and Computing, a non-profit organization.

In 2009 he founded The International Times Archive, a free archive of every page of International Times from its first issue in 1966 to its last in 1994.

A biographical interview may also be found in the style magazine Dazed & Confused. A more complete autobiography may be found in The Times.

Death
Lesser died in London in 2015 at the age of 71. In December 2015, coroner Andrew Walker at Barnet Coroners Court ruled that Lesser died from asphyxiation. Evidence was given that Lesser had suffered from depression for "many years". He had a heart bypass in 1999 and in June 2015 had been told that he had terminal lung cancer. He left a note for his wife and friends.

References

External links
 A LIFE OF ANARCHY: MIKE LESSER INTERVIEW. Slutever, 18 February 2010

1943 births
2015 deaths
British philosophers
British activists
Cellular automatists
People associated with Cranfield University
British anarchists